Tuan Miskin (born 30 November 1968) is a Sri Lankan former first-class cricketer who played for Antonians Sports Club and Kandy Youth Cricket Club.

References

External links
 

1968 births
Living people
Sri Lankan cricketers
Antonians Sports Club cricketers
Kandy Youth Cricket Club cricketers
Place of birth missing (living people)